Nicholas William Hamilton (born 4 May 2000) is an Australian actor, musician and singer  best known for portraying Rellian in Captain Fantastic and Henry Bowers in It and It Chapter Two.

Early life 
Hamilton was born in Lismore, New South Wales, Australia to Vicki Atkins and Craig Hamilton and grew up in Alstonville. Nicholas graduated from Alstonville High School in 2018. He has a brother named Joshua "JJ" Hamilton and two sisters namely Rebecca Hamilton and Rachel Hamilton. His uncle died from cancer in 2011, which he credits as starting his career, stating "I knew I had to pursue acting for him." His first role was the part of Elvis in a grade five school play - Hamilton said he reluctantly took it, but 'really enjoyed [the] whole process' of rehearsal. He later joined a local acting agency.

Career

Film/TV 
Hamilton gained industry attention in the 2013 short film Time, directed by Liam Connor. He played a young boy who believed in time travel. The film was a finalist of the 2013 Tropfest Short Film Festival, and Hamilton won an award at the festival for Best Male Actor. This gained him the attention of Catherine Poulton, an agent in Melbourne, Victoria, Australia. He began his screen career with a role in Mako: Island of Secrets, and parts in short films such as Jackrabbit and Letter to Annabelle.

Hamilton's first role in a feature film was as Nicole Kidman and Joseph Fiennes' son in the Australian drama-suspense film Strangerland. In early 2016, he landed a guest role in Wanted alongside Rebecca Gibney. His first American performance was as Rellian in 2016's Captain Fantastic, for which he was nominated for Best Supporting Actor at the Young Artist Awards, along with the Screen Actors Guild Award for Outstanding Performance by a Cast in a Motion Picture. In 2014, after filming Captain Fantastic, he joined with WME and 3 Arts Entertainment. In 2017, he portrayed Lucas Hanson in the film adaptation of The Dark Tower, as well as his most well-known character portrayal of Henry Bowers in IT. To prepare for the role of Bowers, he read the original novel and liaised with Jarred Blancard, who portrayed Bowers in the 1990 miniseries. In 2018, it was announced he would portray Private Noel Grimes in Danger Close, an Australian film centered on the Battle of Long Tan and Endless/Undying as Chris, a teenager who finds himself trapped in a purgatory searching for a way to make contact with his true love. He returned as young Henry Bowers in It Chapter Two, released in 2019.

In June 2021, Hamilton appeared in Season 2 of Hulu's Love, Victor. He also led Action Royale, a Snapchat Original Series as Trilby, a teenager who starts an underground esports gambling ring to pay off his father's debts and is slated to appear in true-story-film Brave The Dark as Nate, a homeless teen struggling to find his purpose and the courage to confront the darkness of his past.

It has been announced that he will play Tod in Lionsgate's Creepers, Stu in The Pradeeps of Pittsburgh for Amazon Freevee and Lance Lunar in Max Talisman's Things Like This.

Music 
In January 2021, he released his debut single, "Different Year". He subsequently released singles "noRoom", a duet between Hamilton and co-writer Savs, "In Line" and "Pretty Young", the latter becoming the title track of his 2021 debut EP of the same name. This EP also features the tracks "Everything to Lose" and "Intro".

Personal life 
Hamilton moved from his home country of Australia to Los Angeles in 2019 at the age of 18. He has a dog named Nala.

Hamilton is openly gay. He came out at age 18.

Hamilton has also gained fame on the social media site TikTok, where he has gained a following by making cocktails and tasting ready-made alcoholic beverages.

Discography

Singles

EPs

Filmography

Film

Television

Awards

References

External links 

2000 births
21st-century Australian male actors
21st-century Australian male singers
Australian male film actors
Australian male television actors
Australian expatriates in the United States
Australian male child actors
Living people
Australian gay actors
Gay musicians
Australian LGBT singers
Australian LGBT rights activists
New-age musicians